The Nigerian National Assembly delegation from Kano comprises three Senators and fifteen Representatives (down from twenty three in 1999). They form the legislature of Kano State, Nigeria.

9th Assembly (2019–2023)
The 9th National Assembly was inaugurated on 11 June 2019.

Senators representing Kano in 9th Assembly.

House of Reps members representing Kano in 9th Assembly.

8th Assembly (2015–2019)
The 8th National Assembly was Inaugurated on 9 June 2015. The All Progressives Congress (APC) won all the seats in the House of Representatives. This is first time in the history of Kano Politics where no other party has won a seat.

Senators Representing Kano in the 8th National Assembly

House of Representatives

6th Assembly (2007–2011)

The 6th National Assembly (2007–2011) was inaugurated on 5 June 2007.
The People's Democratic Party (PDP) won no Senate seats and two House seats.
The All Nigeria Peoples Party (ANPP) won two Senate seats and thirteen House seats.
In December 2007 the election of Aminu Sule Garo was annulled, and the PDP contender Bello Hayatu Gwarzo was declared elected.

Senators representing Kano State in the 6th Assembly were:

Representatives in the 6th Assembly were:

The 4th Assembly (1999–2003)

The 4th National Assembly (2007–2011) was inaugurated on 29 May 1999.
The People's Democratic Party (PDP) won three Senate seats and twenty two House seats.
The All Nigeria Peoples Party (ANPP) won one House seat.

References

Official Website – National Assembly House of Representatives (Kano State)
 Senator List

Politicians from Kano State
National Assembly (Nigeria) delegations by state